Cyclos is online banking software for microfinance institutions, local banks (in developing countries) and complementary currency systems like LETS, TD4W Credits, Barter networks and time banks.

Cyclos has the following functionality:
 Online banking tools;
 E-commerce platform;
 Business directory;
 Referrals and transaction qualifications;
 Messaging and notification system;
 Call- and support-center logging;
 Integrated management information system;

Cyclos can be accessed through the web but also supports mobile phones (WAP/SMS) and point of sale (POS) devices. Enabling sms and card payments.

References 

 https://www.nytimes.com/2011/10/02/world/europe/in-greece-barter-networks-surge.html
 https://www.theguardian.com/world/2012/mar/16/greece-on-breadline-cashless-currency
 https://web.archive.org/web/20120328114321/http://www.sunflower.ch/index.php?p=site4_cyclos&l=en
 http://trado.info/node/10 
 https://web.archive.org/web/20110928151625/http://www.correntewire.com/cyclos_alternative_currency_software
 https://web.archive.org/web/20120511215702/http://ccmag.net/cyclos/3/6

External links 

 Cyclos project site
 Cyclos documentation
 Cyclos forum
 Cyclos parent foundation

Free finance software
Formerly free software